Canna jaegeriana is a species of herb in the family Cannaceae.

Description 
Generally curved, orange, small (4–7.5 cm long) flowers with free part of staminodes erect, floral bracts mostly caducous, and upper side of leaves often dark brown to black in herbarium material, lower side more or less lanuginose. In addition, the seeds are ellipsoid and relatively small (4–7 × 2–4.5 mm).

Distribution 
It occurs in the Greater Antilles (Dominican Republic, Haiti, Puerto Rico) and tropical South America, north and west of the Amazon Basin (Venezuela, Ecuador, Peru, and Bolivia).

References

 Cooke, Ian, 2001. The Gardener's Guide to Growing cannas, Timber Press. 
 Johnson's Gardeners Dictionary, 1856
 Tanaka, N. 2001. Taxonomic revision of the family Cannaceae in the New World and Asia. Makinoa ser. 2, 1:34–43.

External links
 Kew Gardens, Checklist of plant families
 Proposal to conserve the name Canna jaegeriana

jaegeriana
Flora of Haiti
Flora of the Dominican Republic
Flora of Puerto Rico
Flora of Bolivia
Flora of Peru
Flora of Ecuador
Flora of Venezuela
Flora without expected TNC conservation status